Judith Aitken Ramaley (born 1941) is an American biologist and academic administrator who has served as president of several colleges and universities. She was the president of Winona State University from 2005 to 2012.

Ramaley earned a bachelor's degree from Swarthmore College in 1963, a Ph.D. from the University of California, Los Angeles in 1966, and pursued postdoctoral studies at Indiana University.  Ramaley began her career at the University of Nebraska where she rose to assistant vice president for academic affairs. She served as the 6th president of the Association for Women in Science from 1978-1980.

In 1982, Ramaley became the chief academic officer at the State University of New York at Albany, also serving as executive vice president for academic affairs.  Ramaley was the executive vice chancellor at the University of Kansas from 1987 to 1990 before stepping in as acting president at SUNY Albany. She left  to become the president of Portland State University and later the University of Vermont.

Ramaley resigned from the presidency of the University of Vermont after less than four years, following a hazing scandal involving the hockey team and a union drive by the faculty.
 
Ramaley later became Assistant Director, Education and Human Resources Directorate (EHR), at the National Science Foundation.
On July 18, 2005 Ramaley began her service as the 14th president of Winona State University in Winona, Minnesota.

Upon her resignation from the Winona State presidency she became a distinguished professor of public service at Portland State University.

References

21st-century American biologists
Living people
Presidents of Portland State University
Swarthmore College alumni
Winona State University
University at Albany, SUNY faculty
Presidents of University at Albany
University of California, Los Angeles alumni
University of Maine faculty
Presidents of the University of Vermont
University of Kansas faculty
1941 births